Donald Everett Whitt (November 15, 1930 – September 25, 2013) was an American professional golfer who played on the PGA Tour in the 1950s and 1960s.

Whitt was a student of accomplished black golf instructor Lucius Bateman, teacher of such other multiple-tournament-winning PGA Touring pros as Tony Lema, John McMullin, and Dick Lotz. Developing his swing at Oakland's Airway Fairways driving range under Bateman's tutelage, Whitt captured the 1948 Alameda Commuters tournament as a teenager and that summer came within one hole of winning the Northern California Junior Golf Championship. After serving in the U.S. Navy, Whitt decided to turn professional, accepting a job as a club pro at Sequoyah Country Club in Oakland, California. There, in 1956, on his way to a world record golf score of 58, he three-putted the final two greens, but managed to establish a course record 60 - a score that still stands after more than a half-century of play by noted professionals and amateurs alike. After leaving Sequoyah, he joined the PGA Tour for several years.
 
In 1957, Whitt finished the Tucson Open Invitational in a tie for first (269), but lost in an 18-hole playoff to Dow Finsterwald. That same year, in an article heralding professional golf's "Young Timers" Time magazine wrote of Whitt's "tremendous rally...that included a startling hole-in-one on the 145-yd 13th" before bowing - again to Finsterwald - in the semi-finals of the 1957 PGA Championship. The following year Whitt won his first professional golf tournament, the 1958 Montebello Open. His career year was 1959 when he won Golf Digests Most Improved Player award. He won the Memphis Open in a playoff on May 25 of that year, and just six days later won the Kentucky Derby Open. In January 1960, Sports Illustrated acknowledged Whitt as "a plugger...who can on occasion beat anybody." Aside from Whitt's semi-final loss in the 1957 PGA Championship, his best finish in a major was a T-15 in the 1961 PGA Championship, the same year he captured the Venezuela and Maracaibo Opens, and finished runner-up to Gary Player in the Lucky International tournament in San Francisco. Whitt was a good friend of fellow Bateman-protégé Tony Lema, winner of the 1964 British Open, and is prominently featured in Lema's 1964 memoir "Golfer's Gold", that related their antics on the Caribbean Tour in 1961.

After retiring from full-time play on the Tour, Whitt worked as a teaching pro at the San Diego Golf Academy.

Professional wins (6)
PGA Tour wins (2)PGA Tour playoff record (1–1)'''

Other wins (4)This list may be incomplete''
1958 Montebello Open
1959 Port Arthur Pro Am
1961 Caracas Open, Maracaibo Open Invitational

References

American male golfers
PGA Tour golfers
Golfers from San Francisco
Golfers from San Diego
1930 births
2013 deaths